
Year 501 (DI) was a common year starting on Monday (link will display the full calendar) of the Julian calendar. At the time, it was known as the Year of the Consulship of Avienus and Pompeius (or, less frequently, year 1254 Ab urbe condita). The denomination 501 for this year has been used since the early medieval period, when the Anno Domini calendar era became the prevalent method in Europe for naming years.

Events 
 By place 

 Britannia 
 Domangart Réti succeeds his father Fergus Mór, after he dies during a campaign against the Picts. He becomes the new king of Dál Riata (modern Scotland) (according to the Annals of Tigernach).

 Europe 
 King Gundobad breaks his promise of tribute and regains his military power. He besieges his brother Godegisel at the city of Vienne (Burgundy), and murders him in an Arian church along with the bishop. 

 Asia 
 Dong Hun Hou is killed during a siege of the capital Jiankang. He is succeeded by his  brother Qi He Di, who becomes emperor of Southern Qi (China).
 Muryeong becomes king of Baekje (one of the Three Kingdoms of Korea). During his reign, the kingdom remains allied with Silla and expands its relationships with China and Japan.

 Central America 
June 5 – Ahkal Mo' Naab' I becomes the new ruler of the Mayan city-state of Palenque what is now the state of Chiapas in southern Mexico and reigns until his death in 524.
 The Maya are peaking in economic prosperity. The civilization at Teotihuacan begins to decline and its people are migrating to the greatest Mayan city, Tikal, bringing with them ideas about weaponry and new ritual practices.

 By topic 

 Medicine 
 The Sushruta Samhita medical book becomes a classic of medicine in India. The book contains descriptions of surgery, illnesses, medicinal plants, and a detailed study on anatomy (approximate date).

 Religion 
 Pope Symmachus, accused of various crimes by secular authorities who support an ecclesiastical opponent, asserts that the secular ruler has no jurisdiction over him. A synod held in 502 will confirm that view.

Births 
 Lou Zhaojun, empress dowager of Northern Qi (d. 562)
 Xiao Tong, crown prince of the Liang Dynasty (d. 531)

Deaths 
 April 25 – Rusticus, archbishop of Lyon
 Dongseong, king of Baekje (Korea)
 Fergus Mór, king of Dál Riata (Scotland)
 Godegisel, king of the Burgundians
 Pan Yunu, concubine of Xiao Baojuan 
 Ravina II, Jewish Talmudist and rabbi
 Su Xiaoxiao, Chinese courtesan and poet
 Xiao Baojuan, emperor of Southern Qi (b. 483)
 Teudelinda, Burgundian queen consort

References